Saxe is an unincorporated community in Charlotte County, Virginia, United States. Saxe has a post office with ZIP code 23967, which opened on May 2, 1889. Annefield and Roanoke Plantation, both of which are listed on the National Register of Historic Places, are located near Saxe.

References

Unincorporated communities in Charlotte County, Virginia
Unincorporated communities in Virginia